Las vías del amor (The Tracks of Love) is a Mexican telenovela produced by Emilio Larrosa for Televisa in 2002.

The series stars Aracely Arámbula, Jorge Salinas, Enrique Rocha and Daniela Romo.

Plot
Gabriel is an electronic engineer and former seminarian who is consumed with remorse and guilt; when he was a child he lost his brother Nicholas. That loss caused Gabriel's father a heart attack. His mother has never forgiven him for that.

Gabriel tried to purge his guilt in the priesthood, but left the seminary because of an affair with Sonia, a humble washerwoman. Gabriel never forgot Sonia, despite being in a relationship with Sandra who he does not love. Upon discovering that truth, Sandra attempts suicide. Adolfo, a millionaire and owner of a chain of nightclubs, is in love with Sandra. Gabriel returns to be with Sonia and discovers that she is working as a prostitute and offers to pay all her expenses, her mother’s treatment, and an apartment to make her quit being a prostitute. But Gabriel's true love is far away, in Tlacotalpan.

Perla is a young, cute, and poor waitress who is also a clairvoyant. Her powers let her know that her boyfriend Paco is in danger, but he ignores her. Paco is killed and Perla discovers through her visions that his killer has a tattoo of a skull on the arm. Elmer is an employee of Don Geronimo, the owner of many properties in Tlacotalpan and Perla's boss. Once discovered, Elmer blackmails Perla to accept the marriage proposal from Don Geronimo if she does not want him to kill her father. After Gonzalo, who is Paco's best friend, comes to where Perla lives, Gonzalo wants to find the assassin of his friend and he gets into some problems——one being that he is trafficking with Sebastian and Enrique. Additionally, he is also Elmer's enemy. Gonzalo tells Perla that Paco will protect Perla from Don Geronimo and Sebastian.

Perla accepts Don Geronimo's proposal who will show her a world of luxury and beauty which she always dreamed of. On a trip to Mexico City with her boyfriend Don Geronimo, Perla encounters Gabriel, who will be her true love.

The wedding takes place and, during the banquet, someone murders Don Geronimo. Enrique blames Fidel who flees to the Capital. Sick and penniless, Fidel is rescued by Leticia, a good, hardworking merchant who, by a twist of fate, is harassed and stalked by Sebastian, brother of Don Geronimo. Perla decides to go to the Capital to find her dad with the help from Gabriel, and the two slowly fall in love. But Sonia will make Perla's life miserable to win for Gabriel's love.

But these are not Perla's only problems. First is Sebastian, a criminal who seeks Perla and her father to avenge the death of his brother; there's also 'El Dandy', the pimp of Sonia, who Gabriel confronts in order to defend Sonia, and who now seeks revenge; and Enrique, the son of Don Geronimo who killed him because of the obsession he has with Perla; and he will not rest until he finds her.

Cast

Starring 
 Aracely Arámbula as Perla Gutiérrez Vázquez
 Jorge Salinas as Gabriel Quesada Barragán
 Enrique Rocha as Sebastián Mendoza Romero
 Daniela Romo as Leticia López Albavera
 José Carlos Ruiz as Fidel Gutiérrez Arismendi
 Julio Alemán as Alberto Betanzos
 Alfredo Adame as Ricardo Domínguez
 Nuria Bages as Olga Vázquez de Gutiérrez
 Abraham Ramos as Enrique Mendoza Santini
 Blanca Sánchez as Artemisa Barragán
 Sasha Montenegro as Catalina Valencia
 Gabriel Soto as Adolfo Lascuráin / Nicolás Quesada Barragán

Also starring 
 
 Dulce as Patricia Martínez de Betanzos
 Margarita Magaña as Alicia Betanzos Martínez
 Patricia Navidad as Rocío Zárate
 Rafael Amaya as Paco / Pablo Rivera
 Carlos Miguel as Adalberto Ruiz / El Dandy
 Mónica Dossetti as Mariela Andrade
 Rudy Casanova as Elmer Patiño / El Negro
 Raúl Ochoa as Ernesto Fernández Valencia
 Paola Treviño as Andrea De La Garza
 Eduardo Cuervo as Pedro Betanzos Martínez
 Francisco Avendaño as Javier Loyola Jr.
 Maricruz Nájera as Laura Albavera
 María Prado as Azalia Sánchez
 Thelma Tixou as Fernanda Solís
 Sergio DeFassio as Eloy Álvarez
 Carlos Torres as Edmundo Larios
 Ivonne Montero as Damiana / Madonna
 Arturo Vázquez as Iván Hernández
 Kokin Li as Wong / El Chino
 Bobby Larios as Julián de la Colina
 Julio Monterde as Javier Loyola
 Esperanza Rendón as Gladys Sánchez
 Anghel as Jéssica
 Gustavo Negrete as Aurelio Tobar
 Ricardo Vera as Tadeo Juárez Peña
 Teo Tapia as Leopoldo Dávalos
 Rubén Morales as Efraín
 Manuela Ímaz as Rosaura Fernández López
 Jorge Consejo as Esteban Fernández López
 Elizabeth Álvarez as Sonia "Francis" Vázquez Solís
 Miguel Loyo as Ramón Gutiérrez Vázquez
 Silvia Pinal as Vanessa Vázquez 
 Hugo Aceves as Octavio Vázquez Solís
 Silvia Ramirez as Antonia
 Claudia Troyo as Claudia Jiménez
 Erika García as Lolita Padilla Vale
 Florencia del Saracho as Pamela Fernández

Recurring 
 Juan Ángel Esparza as Carlos Velázquez
 Marco Méndez as Óscar Méndez
 Ricardo Margaleff as Bruno

Awards and nominations

References

External links 

2002 telenovelas
2002 Mexican television series debuts
2003 Mexican television series endings
Mexican telenovelas
Televisa telenovelas
Spanish-language telenovelas